Hendrie is a surname of the Scottish Clan Henderson.

Notable people with a Hendrie surname include:

Anita Hendrie (1863–1940), American actress
Bill Hendrie (1884–1939), Australian rules footballer
Craig Hendrie (born 1974), Australian rules footballer
Charles Hendrie (1886–?), Australian cricketer
Dick Hendrie (1895–1964), Scottish footballer
Gilbert "Gil" Hendrie (1901–1968), Australian rules footballer
Herbert Hendrie (1887–1946), British stained glass artist
Joseph Hendrie (born 1925), American former chairman of the U.S. Nuclear Regulatory Commission (NRC)
John Strathearn Hendrie (1857–1923), former Lieutenant Governor of Ontario
John Hendrie (Scottish footballer) (born 1963), Scottish former footballer
John Hendrie (Australian footballer) (born 1953), Australian footballer
Kelvin Hendrie (1898–1953), Scottish international rugby union player
Lee Hendrie (born 1977), English footballer
Luke Hendrie (born 1994), English footballer
Margaret Hendrie (born 1935), writer of the lyrics to Nauru's national anthem
Paul Hendrie (born 1954), Scottish former footballer
Phil Hendrie (born 1952), U.S. radio host
Stephen Hendrie (born 1995), Scottish footballer
Stuart Hendrie (born 1989), English footballer
Rae Hendrie (born 1977), Scottish actress
Tom Hendrie (born 1955), Scottish former professional football player and manager

See also
Hendry

Clan Henderson
Surnames